Nildoh is a census town in Nagpur district in the Indian state of Maharashtra.

Demographics
 India census, Nildoh had a population of 15,381. Males constitute 56% of the population and females 44%. Nildoh has an average literacy rate of 72%, higher than the national average of 59.5%: male literacy is 78%, and female literacy is 64%. In Nildoh, 18% of the population is under 6 years of age.

References

Cities and towns in Nagpur district